Marcos Vinicius Viana Ribeiro, known as Araruama (born 15 April 1989), is a Brazilian footballer who plays as a central midfielder.

Career
Born in Araruama, Rio de Janeiro, Marcos Vinícius began playing football with local side Olaria where he made his professional debut in the Campeonato Carioca. In 2010, he signed with Botafogo, but suffered a shoulder injury that required surgery, leaving him sidelined for two months. Marcos Vinícius made his Campeonato Brasileiro Série A debut for Botafogo in July 2011, following an injury to regular starter Éverton.

Career statistics
(Correct )

Honours 
 Atlético Itapemirim
 Copa Espírito Santo: 2016
 Campeonato Capixaba: 2017

Boavista
 Copa Rio: 2017

America
 Campeonato Carioca Série B1: 2018

References

External links
Profile at Soccerway

1989 births
Living people
Brazilian footballers
Association football midfielders
Campeonato Brasileiro Série B players
Campeonato Brasileiro Série D players
Olaria Atlético Clube players
Botafogo de Futebol e Regatas players
Joinville Esporte Clube players
Bangu Atlético Clube players
Duque de Caxias Futebol Clube players
Ipatinga Futebol Clube players
Clube Atlético Itapemirim players
America Football Club (RJ) players
Sportspeople from Rio de Janeiro (state)
People from Rio Bonito, Rio de Janeiro
People from Araruama